In the 1949 Virginia gubernatorial election, incumbent Governor William M. Tuck, a Democrat, was unable to seek re-election due to term limits. Virginia State Senator John S. Battle was nominated by the Democratic Party to run against Republican Walter Johnson.

Candidates
John S. Battle, Virginia State Senator (D), who defeated Francis Pickens Miller and Horace Hall Edwards.
Walter Johnson, candidate for Virginia's 1st congressional district in 1946 (R)

Results

References

Gubernatorial
1949
Virginia
Virginia gubernatorial election